St. Peter's Episcopal Church of Germantown is a historic church at 6000 Wayne Avenue in the Germantown section of Philadelphia, Pennsylvania. It was built in 1873 to the designs of Furness & Hewitt.  George W. Hewitt likely was mainly responsible for the design, but the influence of Frank Furness is readily seen in the exuberant proportions of the steeple.

The church was built as part of the suburban development of the area by Henry H. Houston and Houston served as Church Warden for many years.

The church was added to the National Register of Historic Places in 1985. It is a contributing property of the Tulpehocken Station Historic District.

It is currently (2022) the campus of the Waldorf School of Philadelphia.

External links
Waldorf School of Philadelphia official website

References

Properties of religious function on the National Register of Historic Places in Philadelphia
Gothic Revival church buildings in Pennsylvania
Churches completed in 1873
19th-century Episcopal church buildings
Churches in Philadelphia
Frank Furness buildings
Historic district contributing properties in Pennsylvania
Germantown, Philadelphia
Churches on the National Register of Historic Places in Pennsylvania